Dev Patel (born 23 April 1990) is an Indian-British actor. He began acting by playing Anwar Kharral in the teen drama series Skins in 2007. His breakthrough came in 2008 with the leading role of Jamal Malik in Danny Boyle's drama Slumdog Millionaire, for which he was nominated for the BAFTA Award for Best Actor in a Leading Role.

Patel's career expanded with leading roles in the comedy-dramas The Best Exotic Marigold Hotel (2011) and The Second Best Exotic Marigold Hotel (2015) and action film Chappie (2015), and a supporting role in the television series The Newsroom (2012–2014). He received a nomination for the Academy Award for Best Supporting Actor for playing Saroo Brierley in the drama  Lion (2016). He has since starred in the independent films Hotel Mumbai (2018), The Personal History of David Copperfield (2019), and The Green Knight (2021).

Early life and education 
Dev Patel was born on 23 April 1990 in Harrow, the son of Anita, a care worker, and Raju, an IT consultant. His parents are Indian Gujarati Hindus, though they were both born in Nairobi, Kenya, where there is a significant Indian community; they emigrated to England separately in their teens, and first met in London. Patel was raised in the Hindu faith. He speaks some Gujarati. His ancestors hail from Jamnagar and Unjha in Gujarat, India. He grew up in the Rayners Lane district of Harrow and attended Longfield Primary School and Whitmore High School. Patel had his first acting role as Sir Andrew Aguecheek in the school's production of Twelfth Night.

At Whitmore High School, he received an A* in GCSE Drama for his "self-penned portrayal of a child in the Beslan school siege". His drama teacher Niamh Wright has stated, "Dev was a gifted student who quickly impressed me with his innate ability to communicate a wide variety of characters imaginatively and creatively. He was awarded full marks for his GCSE performance to a live audience and the visiting examiner was moved to tears by his honest portrayal." He completed his A Levels in PE, Biology, History, and Drama in 2007 at Whitmore High School while working on Skins.

Patel said that he was "bloody energetic" as a child, and used to get in trouble because of it. He started training at the Rayners Lane Academy of Taekwondo in 2000. He competed regularly in both national and international championships, including the 2004 AIMAA (Action International Martial Arts Association) World Championships in Dublin, where he won a bronze medal. The World Championships took place in October 2004, when he was a red belt competing in the junior division against other red and black belts. He made it to the semi-finals, where he lost to an Irish black belt named Niall Fitzmaurice in "a very close and tough fight", and ended up winning a bronze medal. He later gained a 1st dan black belt in March 2006.

Career

2006–2007: Early work
In 2006, Patel began his acting career when he auditioned for the E4 teen drama television series Skins. Patel's mother saw the casting advert in Metro and took him to the audition even though he had a science exam the next day. After two auditions, he was cast in the role of Anwar Kharral, a British Pakistani Muslim teenager. The characterization of Anwar was partly based on Patel's personality and the role was written specifically for him after he was cast in Skins. Patel, who had no professional acting experience, said that on "the first day of shooting I didn't really know what to do."

The first series of the show aired in January 2007 and went on to win the Rose d'Or for Drama in 2008 and receive a nomination for Best Drama Series at the 2008 BAFTA Television Awards. Patel reprised his role as Anwar for the second series of Skins, which aired in February 2008. The second series of Skins won the Philips Audience Award at the 2009 BAFTA Television Awards.

2008–2010: Career breakthrough

Patel made his feature film debut when he was cast in the role of Jamal Malik, the central character in Danny Boyle's film Slumdog Millionaire. The Jamal Malik character is an Indian Muslim boy born and brought up in the poverty of Bombay, India. Boyle considered hundreds of young male actors, but found that Bollywood leads were generally "strong, handsome hero-types", not the personality he was looking for. Boyle's 17-year-old daughter Caitlin pointed him to Skins.

After five auditions for the role, the actor was eventually cast in August 2007. The film's producer found the original choice for the lead role, Ruslaan Mumtaz, too good-looking for the role. Boyle said, "I wanted a guy who didn't look like a potential hero; I wanted him to earn that in the film." To prepare for the role, Patel went along with Boyle while scouting for filming locations, where he was able to observe the Dharavi slums for himself. He also worked at a call-center for a day and in a hotel, where he washed dishes.

After the release of Slumdog Millionaire at the end of 2008, Patel went on to receive a number of awards for his performance, including a British Independent Film Award, National Board of Review (NBR) Award, Chicago Film Critics Association Award, and two Black Reel Awards for Best Actor and Best Breakthrough Performance. Patel was also nominated for Best Supporting Actor at the 2009 Screen Actors Guild (SAG) Awards. The award eventually went posthumously to Heath Ledger for his performance in The Dark Knight, though Patel did win the Screen Actors Guild Award for Outstanding Performance by a Cast in a Motion Picture, which he shared with ten other cast members from Slumdog Millionaire. On 8 January 2009, Patel won the Critics' Choice Award for Best Young Performer. He was also nominated for two London Critics Circle Film Awards, the NAACP Image Award for Outstanding Supporting Actor, the 2009 BAFTA Award for Best Leading Actor, and European Film Award for Best Actor. The film itself won four Golden Globes, including Best Drama Film, and eight Academy Awards, including Best Picture.

Patel played Zuko in M. Night Shyamalan's The Last Airbender, a feature film adaptation of the animated series Avatar: The Last Airbender, which was released on 1 July 2010 to extremely negative reviews. Despite being a commercial success, the film was a critical failure and Patel even received a Razzie Award nomination as Worst Supporting Actor that year, although his role was well received, and was considered by many to be one of the film's positive aspects.

Patel later starred in the short film The Commuter, which was directed by McHenry Brothers to promote the Nokia N8 smartphone in the UK Fans who won a Nokia UK run competition starred alongside Dev Patel in the short film.

2011–present: Further acclaim
Patel co-starred in The Best Exotic Marigold Hotel (2012), (and subsequently in its 2015 sequel, The Second Best Exotic Marigold Hotel) directed by John Madden, which received positive reviews and was a box office success, grossing $136 million. For the role, he had to take lessons in perfecting an Indian-English accent.

From 2012 to 2014, Patel had a supporting role in the 2012 HBO television series The Newsroom as Neal Sampat, blogger for news anchor Will McAvoy. He also appeared alongside James Franco and Heather Graham in About Cherry, which premiered at the 2012 Berlin International Film Festival.

In 2014, Patel starred alongside Robert Sheehan and Zoë Kravitz in the film, The Road Within, about three unlikely friends with various disabilities who go on a road trip. The film received generally mixed reviews. Variety had positive words for the "bristling and committed performances by Robert Sheehan, Dev Patel and Zoe Kravitz" while noting that "there remains a nagging tidiness to the whole endeavor that leaves a strained, cloying aftertaste" that kept the movie from truly succeeding. 

In 2015, Patel acted in Chappie as an engineer who helps design police robots and as the mathematician Srinivasa Ramanujan in the biopic The Man Who Knew Infinity. In 2016, Patel starred as Saroo Brierley in the biographical film Lion, directed by Garth Davis and co-starring Nicole Kidman and Rooney Mara, which premiered to rave reviews and "Oscar buzz" at the 2016 Toronto International Film Festival. The film is based on Brierley's memoir A Long Way Home. Patel was nominated for Best Supporting Actor for his role at the 70th British Academy Film Awards and the 89th Academy Awards, winning at the former. He is the third actor of Indian descent to receive an Oscar nomination. In 2018, Patel then starred in the action-thriller Hotel Mumbai and The Wedding Guest.

In 2019, Patel starred as David Copperfield in Armando Iannucci's adaptation of Charles Dickens' The Personal History of David Copperfield, for which, he received a nomination for the 2021 Golden Globe Award for Best Actor – Motion Picture Musical or Comedy. In 2021, Patel starred in The Green Knight directed by David Lowery. In April of that year, he signed a deal to "produce, develop and create projects" with ShivHans Pictures. 

In 2018, it was announced that he would make his directorial debut with the action thriller film Monkey Man. In addition to directing, Patel stars in the film, and is credited as a co-writer and producer. Filming completed in 2021 and the film is set to be distributed by Netflix.

Personal life 

He began dating his Slumdog Millionaire co-star Freida Pinto in 2009. On 10 December 2014, the couple announced that they had split after nearly six years of dating.

In March 2017, Patel's relationship with Australian actress Tilda Cobham-Hervey became public. They met nine months earlier on the set of Hotel Mumbai.

Filmography

Film

Television

Video games

See also

 List of awards and nominations received by Dev Patel
 List of British Academy Award nominees and winners
List of actors with Academy Award nominations

References

External links

 
 

1990 births
Living people

21st-century English male actors
Best Supporting Actor AACTA Award winners
Best Supporting Actor AACTA International Award winners
Best Supporting Actor BAFTA Award winners
British expatriates in the United States
British people of Indian descent
British people of Gujarati descent
British Hindus
British male actors of Indian descent
English male film actors
English male taekwondo practitioners
English male television actors
English people of Indian descent
English people of Gujarati descent
English Hindus
Outstanding Performance by a Cast in a Motion Picture Screen Actors Guild Award winners
People from Harrow, London
Asia Game Changer Award winners